The Serga is a river in the south of the Kola Peninsula in Murmansk Oblast, Russia. The Serga originates from the Lake Sergozero and flows into the Varzuga.

References

Rivers of Murmansk Oblast
Drainage basins of the White Sea